Hordijk is a Dutch surname. Notable people with the surname include:

 Cornelis Pijnacker Hordijk (1847–1908), Dutch jurist and politician
 Hendrik "Henk" Hordijk, (1893-1975), Dutch association football player
 Lisa Hordijk (born 1978), birth name of Lisa Lois, Dutch singer
 Roelof Hordijk (1917–1979), Dutch fencer

Dutch-language surnames